Qubaybat (also spelled Qbeibat or Qubayyat)  is a Syrian village located in Sabburah Subdistrict in Salamiyah District, Hama.  According to the Syria Central Bureau of Statistics (CBS), Qbeibat had a population of 483 in the 2004 census. Its inhabitants are predominantly Alawites.

References 

Alawite communities in Syria
Populated places in Salamiyah District